Heniartes is a large genus of assassin bugs belonging to the family Reduviidae; 32 species have been described, all from South America.

Partial species list

Heniartes australis
Heniartes cachabi Wygodzinsky, 1947
Heniartes distinguendus Wygodzinsky, 1947
Heniartes erythromerus Spinola, 1837
Heniartes flavicans
Heniartes lopesi Wygodzinsky, 1947
Heniartes malaisei Wygodzinsky 1953
Heniartes putumayo Wygodzinsky, 1947

External links 

Reduviidae
Cimicomorpha genera
Hemiptera of South America